Fuzuli's Divan in Azerbaijani. This is one of the three Divans created by the poet. The other two are written in Persian and Arabic. The Divan contains several panegyrics, rubais and three hundred ghazals.

The oldest known Divan manuscript is kept at the Institute of Manuscripts of the Azerbaijan Academy of Sciences, in Baku, written no later than the end of the 16th century. It was handed over to the institution by Salman Mumtaz and consists of 65 sheets, each of which contains 20 lines. The Divan's manuscript is decorated with two miniatures, and its last page bears the stamp of its owner with the date: 1038 AH (1628).

The Divan was published several times. In 1924, it was published by the Turkish philologist and publicist Mehmet Fuat Köprülü under the title “Musahhabi külliyati divani Fizuli”. In 1948, it was published in Istanbul by the Turkish literary historian Abdülbaki Gölpınarlı (second edition - 1961). Also, on the basis of the old manuscripts, Fuzuli's Divan was compiled and published by the Institute of Literature and Language named after Nizami, Baku.

See also 
 Hashish and Wine
 Leyli and Majnun

References 

Azerbaijani poetry
Works by Fuzuli